Bigottini is a surname. Notable people with the surname include: 

Émilie Bigottini (1784–1858), French dancer
Francesco Bigottini ( 1717–after 1794), Italian actor, playwright, and set designer